This is a list of Canadian ambassadors and high commissioners to other countries and international organizations, including permanent representatives of ambassadorial rank from Canada.

In cases where a diplomat is accredited to more than one nation, the first country listed is the location of the Ambassador's or High Commissioner's residence, followed by other countries of accreditation, in alphabetical order.

See also
 List of Ambassadors and High Commissioners to Canada
List of Canadian diplomats

References 

Canada
Global Affairs Canada